Impatiens capensis, the orange jewelweed, common jewelweed, spotted jewelweed,  jewelweed, spotted touch-me-not, or orange balsam, is an annual plant in the family Balsaminaceae that is native to
North America. It is common in bottomland soils, ditches, and along creeks, often growing side by side with its less common relative, yellow jewelweed (I. pallida).

Description

The flowers are orange (sometimes blood orange or rarely yellow) with a three-lobed corolla; one of the calyx lobes is colored similarly to the corolla and forms a hooked conical spur at the back of the flower. Plants may also produce non-showy cleistogamous flowers, which do not require cross-pollination.

It often branches extensively. The round stems are glabrous (smooth) and succulent, and semi-translucent, with swollen or darkened nodes on some plants. The leaves are ovate to elliptic, simple, and have shallow, rounded teeth on the margins. The seed pods have five valves which coil back rapidly to eject the seeds in a process called explosive dehiscence or ballistochory. This reaction is where the name 'touch-me-not' comes from; in mature seed pods, dehiscence can easily be triggered with a light touch.

Distribution
Impatiens capensis was transported in the 19th and 20th centuries to England, France, the Netherlands, Poland, Sweden, Finland, and potentially other areas of northern and central Europe. These naturalized populations persist in the absence of any common cultivation by people. This jewelweed species is quite similar to Impatiens noli-tangere, an Impatiens species native to Europe and Asia, as well as the other North American Impatiens. No evidence exists of natural hybrids, although the habitats occupied by the two species are very similar.

In the State of Washington, Impatiens capensis is considered a class C noxious weed due to its rapid spread and tendency to outcompete native jewelweeds. It has also formed a hybrid species with the native jewelweed Impatiens ecornuta.

Uses

As food 
The young shoots can be boiled (with two changes of water) as a potherb; eating too much is not recommended as the plant contains calcium oxalate crystals. The seeds are also edible.

Medicinal 
Along with other species of jewelweed, the juice of the leaves and stems is a traditional Native American remedy for skin rashes, including poison ivy. The effectiveness of its use to prevent the development of a rash after short-term exposure to poison ivy has been supported by peer-reviewed study, and is likely due to the plant containing saponins. These studies also found that some individuals have a sensitivity to jewelweed which can cause a more severe rash.

The stem juice has also been used to treat athlete's foot; its fungicidal qualities have been scientifically verified.

Etymology
The leaves appear to be silver or 'jeweled' when held underwater, which is possibly where the jewelweed name comes from. Another possible source of the name is the color and shape of the bright robin's egg-blue kernels of the green projectile seeds. Both the genus name Impatiens ("impatience" in Latin) and common name spotted touch-me-not refer to how its seeds when ripe pop open on touch.  

The species name capensis, meaning "of the cape", is actually a misnomer, as Nicolaas Meerburgh was under the mistaken impression that it was native to the Cape of Good Hope, in southern Africa.

Pollination

Nectar spurs are tubular elongations of petals and sepals of certain flowers that usually contain nectar. Flowers of Impatiens capensis have these nectar spurs. Nectar spurs are thought to have played a role in plant-pollinator coevolution. Curvature angles of nectar spurs of Impatiens capensis are variable. This angle varies from 0 degrees to 270 degrees.

The angle of the nectar spur is very important in the pollination of the flower and in determining the most efficient pollinator. Hummingbirds are major pollinators. They remove more pollen per visit from flowers with curved nectar spurs than with perpendicular nectar spurs. But hummingbirds are not the only pollinators of Impatiens capensis. Bees, especially bumblebees play an important role in pollination as well. Due to hummingbirds and bees, the pollination of Impatiens capensis is very high.

Gallery

References

External links

Jewelweed

capensis
Flora of North America
Plants described in 1775
Anxiolytics